is a Japanese surname. Notable people with the surname include:

Kishō Taniyama (born 1975), Japanese voice actor
Yutaka Taniyama (1927–1958), Japanese mathematician

Fictional characters:
Mai Taniyama, fictional character in Ghost Hunt

See also
Taniyama, Kagoshima, former city in Kagoshima prefecture, Japan. A part of present Kagoshima, Kagoshima.
Taniyama Station (disambiguation)

Japanese-language surnames